Olena Korotka (b.  in Dnepropetrovsk, Ukrainian SSR) is a draughts player in Brazilian and Russian draughts from Ukraine, world champion in 2018 in both variants, European champion 2016 in Russian draughts (blits). Many times champion of Ukraine. Olena Korotka is Women's International grandmaster (GMIF) since 2016.

From 2001 Lived in Kamianske. Member of the Presidium of the Dnipro City Drafts Federation since 2010. The judge of the first category in draughts.

External links

References 

1983 births
Living people
Ukrainian draughts players
Sportspeople from Dnipro
Players of Brazilian draughts
Players of Russian draughts